Foxhall, also known as Foxhall Village, is a neighborhood in northwestern Washington, D.C., bordered by Reservoir Road on the north side, Foxhall Road on the west, Glover-Archbold Park on the east, and P Street NW on the south (with some properties south of P Street).  The first homes were constructed along Reservoir Road and Greenwich Park Way in the mid-1920s. By the end of December, 1927, some 150 homes had been erected, and the community given the name of Foxhall Village.

Foxhall is mostly residential. Architecturally Foxhall is distinct, because the vast majority of the homes are a brick Tudor style.  It was listed on the National Register of Historic Places in 2007.

Gallery

References

External links

 Foxhall Community Citizens Association

Historic districts on the National Register of Historic Places in Washington, D.C.
1927 establishments in Washington, D.C.
Neighborhoods in Northwest (Washington, D.C.)